John Comyn may refer to:

John Comyn (bishop) (1150–1212), Archbishop of Dublin
John Comyn (died 1242), styled Earl of Angus
John Comyn I of Badenoch (died c. 1275)
John Comyn II of Badenoch (died 1302), son of John I, Guardian of Scotland
John Comyn III of Badenoch (died 1306), killed by Robert the Bruce
John Comyn IV of Badenoch (c. 1294–1314), son of John III
John Comyn, Earl of Buchan (died 1308), cousin of John III
John Comyn of Ulceby (died c. 1332), Anglo-Scottish noble

See also
John Comyns (1667–1740), English judge and MP